A Boy and a Girl may refer to:
 A Boy and a Girl (1983 film)
 A Boy and a Girl (1966 film)